The 2023 Campeonato Brasileiro Série D is a football competition held in Brazil, equivalent to the fourth division. The competition will begin on 6 May and will end on 23 September 2023.

Teams

Federation ranking
The number of teams from each state was chosen based on the CBF State Ranking.

Participating teams

Notes

Format
In the group stage, the 64 teams will be divided into eight groups of eight organized regionally. Top four teams will qualify for the round of 32. From the round of 32 on the competition will be played as a knock-out tournament with each round contested over two legs.

Group stage
In the group stage, each group will be played on a home-and-away round-robin basis. The teams will be ranked according to points (3 points for a win, 1 point for a draw, and 0 points for a loss). If tied on points, the following criteria will be used to determine the ranking: 1. Wins; 2. Goal difference; 3. Goals scored; 4. Head-to-head (if the tie was only between two teams); 5. Fewest red cards; 6. Fewest yellow cards; 7. Draw in the headquarters of the Brazilian Football Confederation (Regulations Article 14).

The top four teams will qualify for the round of 32.

Group A1

Group A2

Group A3

Group A4

Group A5

Group A6

Group A7

Group A8

Final stages
The final stages will be played on a home-and-away two-legged basis. For the round of 16, semi-finals and finals, the best-overall-performance team will host the second leg. If tied on aggregate, the away goals rule will not be used, extra time will not be played, and the penalty shoot-out will be used to determine the winners (Regulations Article 19).

For the quarter-finals, teams will be seeded based on the table of results of all matches in the competition. The top four seeded teams will host the second leg.

The four quarter-finals winners will be promoted to 2024 Série C.

Round of 32
The round of 32 will be a two-legged knockout tie, with the draw regionalised.

Matches

|}

Round of 16

Matches

|}

Quarter-finals
The draw for the quarter-finals will be seeded based on the table of results of all matches in the competition for the qualifying teams. The teams will be ranked according to points. If tied on points, the following criteria would be used to determine the ranking: 1. Wins; 2. Goal difference; 3. Goals scored; 4. Fewest red cards; 5. Fewest yellow cards; 6. Draw in the headquarters of the Brazilian Football Confederation (Regulations Article 16).

Matches

|}

Semi-finals

Matches

|}

Finals

Matches

|}

References 

Campeonato Brasileiro Série D seasons
4
2023 in Brazilian football